The Shame Just Drained or The Shame Just Drained: The Vanda & Young Collection Vol. 1 is a compilation album consisting of studio outtakes, songs from the scrapped 2nd album for United Artist Records, demos and rarities by Australian rock band The Easybeats.

The Vanda & Young Collection and Release
Despite the album's subheading of The Vanda & Young Collection Vol. 1, there has yet to be a second volume released.  In 1976 Albert Productions released a compilation album titled The Vanda & Young Story Volume 1.  This album featured the same font as on The Shame Just Drained drained cover.  Like The Shame Just Drained, The Vanda & Young Story also did not have a second volume released.  The album was first released on October 10, 1977 by Albert Productions. It was later reissued by Repertoire Records and included nine more tracks.

Track listing

All songs written by Harry Vanda & George Young except as noted.

References

External links
 Albert Music - The Shame Just Drained
 

The Easybeats albums
1977 compilation albums
Albums produced by Shel Talmy
Albert Productions compilation albums